Kai Cheng Thom is a Canadian writer and former social worker. Thom, a non-binary trans woman, has published four books, including the novel Fierce Femmes and Notorious Liars: A Dangerous Trans Girl's Confabulous Memoir (2016), the poetry collection a place called No Homeland (2017), a children's book, From the Stars in The Sky to the Fish in the Sea (2017), and I Hope We Choose Love: A Trans Girl's Notes from the End of the World (2019), a book of essays centered on transformative justice.

Career 

Thom's first book, Fierce Femmes and Notorious Liars: A Dangerous Trans Girl's Confabulous Memoir, was published by Metonymy Press in 2016. It was shortlisted for the Lambda Literary Award for Transgender Fiction at the 29th Lambda Literary Awards, and the year after it was published Thom won the 2017 Dayne Ogilvie Prize for LGBTQ Emerging writers. The Dayne Ogilvie jury, consisting of writers Jane Eaton Hamilton, Elio Iannacci and Trish Salah, cited Thom's work as "sheer joyful exuberance, creativity, and talent", calling Fierce Femmes "a delicious and fabulist refashioning of a trans memoir as fiction" and "a genre-breaking refusal of the idea that the only stories trans people have to tell are their autobiographies." In 2019, Fierce Femmes and Notorious Liars was chosen by Emma Watson for her online feminist book club Our Shared Shelf.

Thom's debut children's picture book, From the Stars in the Sky to the Fish in the Sea was published in 2017 by Arsenal Pulp Press.

In 2018, Arsenal Pulp Press published Thom's debut poetry collection a place called No Homeland. The book was an American Library Association Stonewall Honor Book in 2018, and was a shortlisted finalist for the Publishing Triangle Award for Trans and Gender-Variant Literature. Room Magazine called the book a "vulnerable, shimmering debut." Further in the Room Magazine review, the reviewer Adele Barclay writes "Many of Thom's poems deploy this bold, storytelling voice, foregrounding the wisdom of what is said, experienced, lived, rumoured, and gossiped in lieu of traditional history with its myopia of normativity. a place called No Homeland consistently examines the collisions that marginalized identities encounter. And through this, Thom finds, 'there is a poem waiting deep below.'"

In 2019, Thom published her non-fiction debut, I Hope We Choose Love: A Trans Girl's Notes from the End of the World. It was a 2020 American Library Association Stonewall Honor Book, and won the Publishing Triangle Award for Trans and Gender-Variant Literature.

In 2020, From the Stars in the Sky to the Fish in the Sea was selected by Julie Andrews for inclusion in her Julie's Library podcast.

Thom has written for Xtra Magazine, Everyday Feminism, BuzzFeed, Autostraddle, Asian American Literary Review and xoJane.

Education
Thom has dual master's degrees in social work and couple and family therapy from McGill University.

References

21st-century Canadian poets
21st-century Canadian novelists
Canadian women poets
Canadian women novelists
Canadian writers of Asian descent
Canadian LGBT poets
Canadian LGBT novelists
Transgender women
Canadian transgender writers
Canadian non-binary writers
Writers from Toronto
McGill University alumni
Living people
Year of birth missing (living people)
21st-century Canadian women writers
Transgender poets
Transgender memoirists
Transgender novelists
21st-century Canadian LGBT people